The RWI – Leibniz-Institut für Wirtschaftsforschung, Essen (RWI Essen) is an independent economic research institute and think tank in Essen, Germany. Founded in 1926, the RWI maintains a non-profit status, mainly funded through public means while also receiving third-party-fundings. It conducts research on economic development, assists policy-making, and fosters economic literacy for the public. The RWI currently employs 120 people and is part of the Leibniz Association, a group of non-university research institutes in Germany.

The current head of the RWI is Christoph M. Schmidt, a German economist and professor for economic policy and applied econometrics at Ruhr-Universität Bochum. He received his Diplom in Economics from the University of Mannheim (1987) and a M.A./Ph.D. in Economics from Princeton University (1989, 1991).

History
The RWI began operations in 1926. Founded by Ernst Wagemann, the RWI was initially intended to be the "Department of the West", in contrast to the Deutsches Institut für Wirtschaftsforschung (German Institute for Economic Research). The Essen branch sought to observe economic patterns and trends in the Rhine-Westphalian industrial region.

After the Second World War, the coal and steel industries became integral to German integration back into the European and world economy. The RWI continued to conduct research, joining the Arbeitsgemeinschaft Deutscher Wirtschaftswissenschaftlicher Forschungsinstitute (Working Committee of German Economic Research Institutes) in 1949 and the Westdeutscher Handwerkskammertag (West German Chamber of Crafts and Skilled Trades' Council) in 1950.

By the 1970s, the RWI established itself as a leading economic research institute. In 2002, Schmidt became president and expanded the research areas to include fields such as labor market policy, education policy, and migration. On August 17, 2017, the RWI changed its name to the RWI – Leibniz-Institut für Wirtschaftsforschung (RWI – Leibniz Institute for Economic Research). Past presidents of the RWI include:
 1926-1947: Ernst Wagemann
 1947-1952: Bruno Kuske
 1952-1972: Theodor Wessels
 from 1972/73: Board of Directors: Bernhard Filusch, Willi Lamberts, Gregor Winkelmeyer
 1986: Hans K. Schneider
 1989: Paul Klemmer
 2002-present: Christoph M. Schmidt

Research
The research work of the RWI is structured along four "competence areas":
 Labor Markets, Education, Population
 Health Economics
 Environment and Resources
 Climate Change and Development
 Macroeconomics and Public Finance

Education
The RWI is one of the administrators of the Ruhr Graduate School in Economics (RGS Econ). Founded in 2004, the RGS Econ collaborates with universities in Bochum, Dortmund, and Duisburg-Essen to provide scholars the opportunity to conduct economic research. RGS Econ also offers a PhD program.

Report on the German economy
The RWI is one of the economic research institutes in Germany that, twice a year (in spring and autumn), submit a joint report on the state of the German economy, the so-called Gemeinschaftsdiagnose (joint diagnosis). The other institutes that submit the research report are part of the Leibniz Association. The RWI collaborates with the other groups to publish a joint report on the state of the German economy, the Gemeinschaftsdiagnose (Joint Economic Forecast). The other leading research institutes include:
 The Kiel Institute for the World Economy in Kiel
 Deutsches Institut für Wirtschaftsforschung (DIW), in Berlin
Ifo Institut für Wirtschaftsforschung, in Munich in cooperation with KOF Konjunkturforschungsstelle of the ETH Zürich, in Zürich, Switzerland
Institut für Wirtschaftsforschung (IWH), in Halle in cooperation with the Institut für Makroökonomie und Konjunkturforschung in der Hans-Boeckler-Stiftung, in Düsseldorf and Österreichisches Institut für Wirtschaftsforschung, in Vienna, Austria
 Hamburgisches Welt-Wirtschafts-Archiv, in Hamburg

References

External links
 (German or English)
Website of the Ruhr Graduate School in Economics (graduate school located at the RWI Essen)

RWI
Non-profit organisations based in North Rhine-Westphalia
Political and economic think tanks based in Germany
Global economic research
Essen